Sebastien Knab, O.P. (c. 1632 – 8 September 1690) was a Roman Catholic prelate who served as Archbishop of Nakhijevan (1682–1690).

Biography
Sebastien Knab was born in Bamberg in around 1632 and ordained a priest in the Order of Preachers. On 28 September 1682, he was appointed during the papacy of Pope Innocent XI as Archbishop of Nakhchivan. On 18 October 1682, he was consecrated bishop by Alessandro Crescenzi (cardinal), Bishop of Recanati e Loreto, with Odoardo Cibo, Titular Archbishop of Seleucia in Isauria, and Gregorio Carducci, Bishop of Valva e Sulmona, serving as co-consecrators. He served as Archbishop of Nakhchivan until his death on 8 September 1690.

References 

17th-century Roman Catholic bishops in the Ottoman Empire
Bishops appointed by Pope Innocent XI
1632 births
1690 deaths
Dominican bishops
17th-century Roman Catholic bishops in Safavid Iran